Wanaku (Quechua for guanaco, also spelled Guanaco) is a mountain in the Andes of Peru which reaches a height of approximately . It is located in the Ancash Region, Ocros Province, Rajan District.

References

Mountains of Peru
Mountains of Ancash Region